It's Alive is  the debut studio album by American band La Luz. It was released in October 2013 under Hardly Art.

Track listing

References

2013 debut albums
La Luz (band) albums
Hardly Art albums